Suburbia Highschool (also known as Sub High) is a German comic written and illustrated by David Füleki and first published by Delfinium Prints in 2008.

Plot 
The humorous Story follows Lizney Maypole, a teenage student whose biggest problems are a mysterious boyfriend and a robot as her math teacher.

Characters 

 Lizney Maypole is a young blond girl attending Suburbia Highschool. She is very bad at maths and thinks that her teacher is a robot.
 Peach is Lizney's boyfriend and attends the same high school as her. He eats a lot of peaches along with their pips and seems to keep a dark secret.
 Pitch is a mysterious boy who seems to be Peach's evil twin. His sinister plans include stealing Suburbia Highschool's cryptic class book of dark arts.
 Mr. TX 523 is Lizney's teacher in mathematics. He doesn't like wrong answers and makes this very clear to his students. Although it is obvious that he's not a human being, Lizney is the only person seeing him as a robot.

Released chapters 
Chapter 1: "Willkommen an der Suburbia Highschool"
Chapter 2: "Bad Hair Day"
Chapter 3: "Leckere Menschenbabys"

External links 
 Delfinium Prints

German comics
Comics by David Füleki
2008 comics debuts
Delfinium Prints
School-themed comics
Humor comics
Teen comedy comics
Fantasy comics
Fictional high schools
Fictional locations in comics